Grzegorz Piechna (born 18 September 1976) is a Polish former professional footballer who played as a forward. He scored 21 goals in 36 matches in Polish Ekstraklasa and was top league goalscorer once.

Career
Piechna's nickname is Kiełbasa (a sausage), because before he started his career he worked for a butchery.

Piechna played for Korona Kielce and Widzew Łódź in the Polish Ekstraklasa.

International goals
Scores and results list Poland's goal tally first, score column indicates score after each Piechna goal.

Honours
 Ekstraklasa top scorer: 2006

References

External links

 
 

1976 births
Living people
People from Opoczno
Sportspeople from Łódź Voivodeship
Polish footballers
Association football forwards
Poland international footballers
Korona Kielce players
FC Torpedo Moscow players
Widzew Łódź players
Polonia Warsaw players
Kolejarz Stróże players
Ekstraklasa players
Russian Premier League players
Polish expatriate footballers
Polish expatriate sportspeople in Russia
Expatriate footballers in Russia